Dolenji Suhor pri Vinici is a settlement halfway between Dragatuš and Vinica in the Municipality of Črnomelj in the White Carniola area of southeastern Slovenia. The area is part of the traditional region of Lower Carniola and is now included in the Southeast Slovenia Statistical Region.

Name
The name of the settlement was changed from Dolenji Suhor to Dolenji Suhor pri Vinici in 1953. In the past the German name was Untersuchor.

References

External links
Dolenji Suhor pri Vinici on Geopedia

Populated places in the Municipality of Črnomelj